Charles Robison "Rob" Orr (born September 1950) was the men's swim coach at Princeton University from 1979 to 2019. Before arriving at Princeton, Orr was an assistant coach for USC for three years.  During his tenure at Princeton, he was the head coach at the 1991 Olympic Festival and in 1993 was the women's head coach for the U.S. national junior team.

Swimming career 

Orr graduated from San Gabriel High School in California in 1968. As a senior in high school, Orr earned All-America status in the 100 yard butterfly.  Orr's time of 52.9 seconds placed him sixth in the nation, five spots behind Mark Spitz.  After graduation, Orr went on to have a successful career at the University of Southern California which included selection to the 1971 Pan American Games swim team representing the United States in Cali, Colombia; Orr was the silver medalist in the 200 meter butterfly in Cali.  As a senior at USC, Orr was voted Team Captain by his teammates and earned All-America status in the 200 yard butterfly, placing fifth in the nation.  Once again, Orr placed behind Mark Spitz who won the event at NCAA Championships.  Orr also competed in the 1972 Olympic Trials where he placed 15th in prelims.

Coaching career at Princeton 

Orr was named the head men's swim coach at Princeton University for the 1979-1980 and is currently in his 37th year at the school.  His teams have won 19 EISL/Ivy League championships, most recently in 2012.  His career record in dual meets, 287-41, includes a 115-2 record at Princeton's DeNunzio Pool (the first loss came after a 107 meet winning streak in DeNunzio Pool).  Orr has been the EISL or Ivy League coach of the year six times and coached the Tigers to five top 20 finishes at NCAA Championships.  In 1989 and 1990, Princeton's 200 medley relay team won the event at NCAA's in American record time.  Orr has been described as "part nutty professor [and] part genius" and is also "one of the most beloved."

Personal life 

Orr currently resides in Pennington, New Jersey with his wife Benji with whom he has two sons, Braden and Scotty.

References 

Princeton Tigers swimming coaches
1950 births
Sportspeople from Los Angeles County, California
Living people
American male butterfly swimmers
Swimmers from California
Pan American Games medalists in swimming
Pan American Games silver medalists for the United States
USC Trojans men's swimmers
USC Trojans swimming coaches
Swimmers at the 1971 Pan American Games
Medalists at the 1971 Pan American Games